Marco Cattaneo (born 5 June 1982) is an Italian former professional road cyclist.

Major results
2006
 2nd Circuito del Porto
 3rd Overall Giro Ciclistico d'Italia
2007
 1st Coppa della Pace
 2nd Overall Giro della Toscana
 8th Piccolo Giro di Lombardia
2008
 9th Overall Brixia Tour

References

External links

1982 births
Living people
Italian male cyclists
Cyclists from Milan